The Congress-Bundestag Youth Exchange (CBYX, German name: Parlamentarisches Patenschafts-Programm or PPP) is a youth student exchange program founded in 1983.  The program, which is jointly sponsored by the United States Congress and the German Bundestag, funds exchange programs for German and American students through grants to private exchange organizations in both countries. The funding in the United States is administered by the Bureau of Educational and Cultural Affairs of the United States Department of State.

The program was established to celebrate the 300th anniversary of German settlement in North America and has been renewed by both legislative bodies since its inception.  Over 26,000 German and American students have completed their exchange through the program, which provides a full exchange year complete with orientation and language programs and travel opportunities within Germany and the United States. The exchange year culminates in a conference in Washington, D.C.

The scholarship program is merit-based and is funded based on the congressional district for Americans and Bundesland for Germans. It consists of a High School program; currently administered by six organizations in the United States: AFS Intercultural Programs, ASSE, Ayusa, Council on International Educational Exchange (CIEE) and Youth For Understanding (YFU); a Young Professionals program (administered exclusively by Cultural Vistas) and a Vocational Student program (administered by Nacel Open Door).

High School program 

The largest portion of the scholarship program has been the high school scholarships. Originally the program was only open to high school sophomores and juniors, who would spend their scholarship year in Germany, during what would be their junior or senior year in high school. Currently, the program makes 230-250 (the number fluctuates, depending on funding) national scholarships available to any high school student between the ages of 15-18.5 with a 3.0 or higher GPA on a 4.0 scale, and who is a U.S. citizen, national, or permanent resident. Applications are due in December of the year prior to the scholarship year. After receipt of a full application, select students will be offered an interview, conducted by selection committees in various locations in the United States. These selection committees then put forward the names of the best candidates to receive the scholarships, which are usually approved by the administering organizations.

The following organizations administer the high school program by region:
 AFS Intercultural Programs (AFS) - Northeastern United States 
 American Scandinavian Student Exchange (ASSE) - Northwestern United States, Western United States, Alaska, and Hawaii
 Council on International Educational Exchange (CIEE) - Southeastern United States and Southwestern United States
 Youth For Understanding (YFU USA)- Midwestern United States

Each program in the United States has a sister program in Germany, the main counterpart being Partnership International e.V. Through CBYX's first decade and a half, Youth For Understanding (YFU) had been the primary administrative organization for the program. YFU's organization administration of the CBYX program ended after the dissolution of the United States Information Agency (USIA) in late 1999. The USIA had overseen the program on behalf of the U.S. Federal Government. In 2008, YFU again became a primary administrative organization for the grant.

American students who receive the scholarship usually spend 11 months in Germany. The first few weeks of the program are taken up by an Orientation and Language Seminar. The remaining ten months of the program usually see the students spread out over Germany, staying with a host family. They attend a Gymnasium, the German equivalent of high school, for an academic year. Other seminars take place over the course of the year, including a trip to the capital in Berlin, where the scholars speak, in German, to the German Bundestag. 

The admission rate to the scholarship is not published, but competitive.

Young Professionals Exchange Program 
This scholarship exchange is dedicated to young professionals between the ages of 18 and 24 who have clear career goals and some relevant work experience in their career field, as well as an openness to cultural exchange. Currently 75 young Germans and 75 young Americans participate in the exchange, living in all 16 German Bundesländer and 39 US states. The program is designed primarily for young Americans in business, technical, engineering, agricultural and vocational fields, while German participants have all completed an Ausbildung (practical training) in their field. Cultural Vistas administers the program in the United States and the Deutsche Gesellschaft für Internationale Beziehungen (GIZ) GmbH administers the program in Germany.

American applicants for the Young Professionals portion must be between the ages of 18 and 24 at the start of the program, must be US citizens or permanent residents, must have work and academic experience in their field, must have a strong sense of American identity and interest in German and international affairs, and must show flexibility and diplomacy. German language skills are not required to participate. Applications are due December 1 of each year, and can be completed online at www.culturalvistas.org/cbyx.  After the initial application round, candidates are interviewed at various locations across the U.S. by a team of Cultural Vistas staff, CBYX alumni, host families, German professors, and other program-supporters.

After applying for the program, 150 potential candidates are selected to interview in their state of residence; Seventy-five candidates are then selected to participate in the program, which includes: 
placement with a German host, or, if no host family can be found, students are placed in a WG (shared apartment) or Studentenwohnheim (student dorm).
two months of intensive German language training (depending on each participant's language level)
a semester at a German university, college [Hochschule], or college of applied sciences [Fachhochschule]
a five-month internship in the participant's career field
international airfare, partial living stipends, various seminar expenses, and partial travel expenses

German applicants for the Young Professionals portion must be between the ages of 18 and 23 at the start of the program. Candidates must be in a practical training track and must complete their training (Ausbildung) before the program start date. English skills are required for program participation. Applications are due in September of each year. After an interview with InWent and taking a Test of English as a Foreign Language (TOEFL), candidates meet with their elected district representatives (Abgeordneten) for final selection. One hundred candidates are then selected for the program.

The program starts in the summer for both American and German participants. Americans begin with a two-month language school phase, with the 75 participants divided up into three groups and sent to three different cities usually being Cologne, Saarbrücken or Radolfzell am Bodensee. This two-month phase is followed by a semester at a German university or professional school (Fachhochschule). Some participants may also complete training in the dual-track system (Berufschule). The third phase of the year is a five-month internship with a German company or organization. During the year most participants live with host families, but some stay in shared apartments or dormitories. American participants attend an orientation seminar in Washington, DC, a midyear seminar in Frankfurt, a final seminar in Berlin, and an evaluation seminar in New York.

Before the German participants arrive in the U.S., their program begins with a week-long preparation seminar in Germany in April. After a four-day orientation seminar in New York City, participants travel to their final placements having short-term home stays along the way. Participants study for one semester at a community or technical college or university in some cases and complete the work phase from January to June. During the year participants live with host families and in some cases dormitories. German participants attend a preparation seminar in Germany, an orientation seminar in New York, a final seminar in Washington, DC, and a wrap-up seminar in Germany in the fall after the program.

Young Vocationalists Exchange Program 
This scholarship program sends graduating American high school seniors aged 18–19 (some with a vocational specializations and some from regular high schools) to Germany for two months of intensive language training followed by ten months of practical training and schooling in their field of interest. The first two months are spent with the group in Bonn, Germany, where the students live with host families and attend a German language school and cultural excursions. The following ten months are spent apart from the exchange group, where students live with host families in various cities or regions of Germany preassigned by the program. Depending on language proficiency and professional fields of interest, the students attend some sort of school (normal high school or other) for up to five months. By February, all the students start internships in their particular field of interest. The students may find their own internships, or can ask for help from their host families and/or area representatives. These selections are based on the location of various area representatives and the availability of specific fields of internships in those locations. Students also participate in two seminars held in Berlin: a mid-term seminar (with fellow vocational program students) and a re-entry seminar (with all fellow CBYX program participants). Prior German language skills are not required. Nacel Open Door recruits and selects participants for this exchange and administers the program.

Program administration in Germany 
The following organizations administer the CBYX/PPP program in Germany:

Youth For Understanding Germany
AFS Intercultural Programs
Partnership International e.V.
Experiment e.V.
GIVE e.V.
Open Door International e.V.
Deutsche Gesellschaft für Internationale Zusammenarbeit GmbH

References

External links
U.S. State Department Page
 Official Alumni site, administered by Cultural Vistas
 Application website for the High School program
 Application website for the Young Professionals program
 Application website for the Vocational High School program
 Alumni site, administered by alumnus Kelly Vielmo
 Official Alumni site on the German part, administered by PPP Alumni e.V.
 AFS Homepage
 AIFS Homepage
 ASSE Homepage
 CIEE Homepage
 Cultural Vistas Homepage
 Nacel Open Door Homepage
 YFU USA Homepage
 German YFU Komitee e.V.
 The Experiment in International Living, USA Homepage
 GIZ - CBYX Homepage for German Young Professionals

Education in Germany
Education in the United States
Germany–United States relations
German-American culture in Washington, D.C.
Student exchange
Bureau of Educational and Cultural Affairs